Plocamopherus fulgurans is a species of sea slug, a nudibranch, a shell-less marine gastropod mollusk in the family Polyceridae.

Distribution 
This species was described from New Caledonia It has been reported from New Caledonia in 2010.

References

Polyceridae
Gastropods described in 1928